Bawan Jhala Muzaffarpur is a village and Gram panchayat in Bilhaur Tehsil, Kanpur Nagar district, Uttar Pradesh, India. It is located 67 KM away from Kanpur City. Its village code is 149922.

References

Villages in Kanpur Nagar district